DD.43.T.139 was a pigeon who received the Dickin Medal in February 1947 from the People's Dispensary for Sick Animals for bravery in service during the World War II. Serving with the Australian Army Signal Corps, DD.43.T.139 was cited for homing  to Madang, Papua New Guinea during a heavy tropical storm after being released from an Australian army boat that was foundering. The message allowed a rescue ship to be sent in time to salvage the craft and its cargo of stores and ammunition.

See also
 List of individual birds

References

External links
 PDSA Dickin Medal

Recipients of the Dickin Medal
Individual domesticated pigeons